Postal codes in Nicaragua are 5 digit numeric. There are a total 929 postal codes assigned to 153 municipalities and 776 neighbourhoods in Managua.

References

External links
 Search your Postal Code (in Spanish)

Nicaragua
Communications in Nicaragua